Polyptychia hermieri is a moth of the family Notodontidae. It is found in French Guiana, Trinidad and the lower Amazon basin.

Larvae have been recorded on Passiflora candida.

External links
Species page at Tree of Life project

Notodontidae of South America
Moths described in 2009